Kiel is an unincorporated community in northwest Franklin County, in the U.S. state of Missouri.

The community is on Missouri Route C approximately six miles south of New Haven.

History
A post office called Kiel was established in 1883, and remained in operation until 1909. The community takes its name from Kiel, in Germany, the native home of a large share of the first settlers.

References

Unincorporated communities in Franklin County, Missouri
Unincorporated communities in Missouri